Olearia telmatica, commonly known as akeake, is a species of flowering plant in the family Asteraceae native to the Chatham Islands of New Zealand.

References

telmatica
Flora of the Chatham Islands
Plants described in 2008